Petronella or Petronilla is a feminine given name. It may also refer to:

 Petronella (film), a 1927 German-Swiss silent film
 Petronella, United States Virgin Islands, a settlement
 Petronella, a traditional Anglo-Celtic tune and associated country dance form - see contra dance choreography

See also
 Petronila (disambiguation)
 Perpolita petronella, a species of land snail
 "Hej, sa Petronella", a Swedish children's song
 Petronel, a 16th or 17th century firearm